Hudáček is a Czech and Slovak family name. Notable people with the surname include:

 Július Hudáček (born 1988), Slovak hockey player
 Libor Hudáček (born 1990), Slovak hockey player
 Vladimír Hudáček (born 1971), Czech hockey player

Czech-language surnames